Momo Skokić (born 1 July 1968) is a Yugoslav cross-country skier. He competed in the men's 10 kilometre classical event at the 1992 Winter Olympics.

References

1968 births
Living people
Yugoslav male cross-country skiers
Olympic cross-country skiers of Yugoslavia
Cross-country skiers at the 1992 Winter Olympics
Place of birth missing (living people)